National Monuments Council may refer to:
 National Monuments Council (Chile)
 National Monuments Council (South Africa and Namibia)